The Arizona Diamondbacks are a professional baseball team based in Phoenix, Arizona. They compete in the Western Division of Major League Baseball's (MLB) National League (NL). Arizona first competed in Major League Baseball during the 1998 baseball season as an expansion team. The list below documents players and teams that hold particular club records.

In 25 seasons from 1998 through 2022, the team has won 1,914 games and one World Series championship, in 2001. The team has appeared in six postseasons and has won one league pennant. Luis Gonzalez owns the most franchise career batting records with 11 and the most franchise single-season batting records with 9. Randy Johnson owns the most franchise career and single-season pitching records with 10 and 7, respectively.

Having won the World Series in 2001, the franchise's fourth season in existence, the Diamondbacks hold the distinction of being the fastest expansion team in Major League Baseball to win a championship. In addition, two no-hitters have been thrown in the history of the franchise.

Statistics are current through the 2022 season.

Individual career records
These are records of players with the best performance in particular statistical categories during their tenure with the Diamondbacks.

Career batting

Career pitching

Individual single-season records
These are records of Diamondbacks players with the best performance in particular statistical categories during a single season.

Single-season batting

Single-season pitching

Team single-game records

These are records of Diamondbacks teams with the best performance in particular statistical categories during a single game.

Single-game batting

Single-game pitching

Team season records

These are records of Diamondbacks teams with the best and worst performances in particular statistical categories during a single season.

Season batting

Season pitching

Team all-time records
Source:

Notes

See also
Baseball statistics
History of the Arizona Diamondbacks

References

External links
Arizona Diamondbacks official website

Records
Arizona Diamondbacks